Franco Maximiliano Fagioli (born 1981, in Tucumán) is an Argentinian operatic countertenor.

Life
Born in Argentina, Fagioli initially studied piano and then singing at the Superior Art Institute of the Teatro Colón in Buenos Aires. He began his international career in 2003, when he won the Bertelsmann singing competition Neue Stimmen in Gütersloh, Germany.

Franco Fagioli has since made regular appearances at opera houses in Buenos Aires, Karlsruhe, Bonn, Zurich, Essen and Genoa, at the Theater an der Wien in Vienna and the Théâtre des Champs-Elysées in Paris. He has also been invited to perform at a number of festivals, including those in Halle, Ludwigsburg, Innsbruck and Froville.

He has worked with conductors such as Rinaldo Alessandrini, Alan Curtis, Gabriel Garrido, Nikolaus Harnoncourt, René Jacobs, José Manuel Quintana, Marc Minkowski, Riccardo Muti and Christophe Rousset.

Franco Fagioli is one of the five countertenors to appear in the opera, TV, CD and DVD production of Leonardo Vinci’s Artaserse, which has been awarded numerous national and international music prizes for example the Echo Award 2013 and 2014 or the Preis der deutschen Schallplattenkritik.

The 2013/2014 season was launched with the release of the CD Arias for Caffarelli, which includes many world premieres; this was accompanied by concerts in Germany, France and Denmark. Franco Fagioli made his debut at the 2014 Salzburg Whitsun Festival with his programme Giambattista Velutti. In the same year, there were two debuts with works by Mozart: after performing the part of Sesto in La clemenza di Tito in Nancy, he debuted as Idamante in Martin Kušej’s new production of Idomeneo at the Royal Opera House, Covent Garden, in November 2014.

In the autumn of 2014, his solo CD Il maestro Porpora – Arias was released, in which Franco Fagioli paid homage to the Italian composer and singing teacher Nicola Porpora (1686–1768). He also made an appearance on the CD Siroe – Re di Persia, which was released at about the same time, as well as featuring on a CD entitled La Concordia de’ pianeti, a rediscovered work by the Baroque composer Antonio Caldara.

Discography
Solo recitals
 Arte Nova Voices. Händel, Mozart. Opera Arias Gustav Kuhn (ARTE NOVA) 2005.
 Franco Fagioli. Canzone e Cantate. (Carus Verlag/SWR) 2010.
 Arias for Caffarelli: Vinci, Leo, Hasse, Pergolesi, Santo. Il pomo d'oro. Riccardo Minasi (Naïve Records) 2013.
 Il Maestro Porpora – Arias (Naïve Records) 2014.
 Franco Fagioli. Rossini George Petrou (Deutsche Grammophone) 2016.
 Handel: Arias Zevira Valova (Deutsche Grammophone) 2018.
Veni, Vidi, Vinci, Arias by Leonardo Vinci, Il pomo d'oro, Zevira Valova (Deutsche Grammophone), 2020.
Opera
 Christoph Willibald Gluck: Ezio (Oehms Classics/SWR) 2008.
 George Frideric Handel: Teseo (Carus Verlag/SWR) 2009.
 George Frideric Handel: Berenice (EMI/Virgin Classics) 2010.
 unknown composer: Germanico, Ottaviano Tenerani, (Sony/Deutsche Harmonia Mundi) 2011.
 Leonardo Vinci: Artaserse (Virgin Classics/EMI) 2013.
 Johann Adolph Hasse: Siroe (DECCA) 2014.
 Antonio Caldara: La concordia de' pianeti (ARCHIV) 2014.
 Gluck: Orfeo ed Euridice Laurence Equilbey (ARCHIV) 2015.
 Vinci: Catone in Utica Riccrdo Minasi (DECCA) 2015.
 Giovanni Battista Pergolesi: Adriano in Siria Jan Tomasz Adamus (DECCA) 2016.
 Händel: Rodelinda Diego Fasolis (DYNAMIC) 2016.

Sacred works
 Agostino Steffani: Stabat Mater (DECCA) 2014.
 Vivaldi: Gloria, Nisi Dominus, Nulla in mundo pax (Classica) 2018.

References

External links
 Official website of Franco Fagioli
 Franco Fagioli biography on parnassus.at

1981 births
Living people
Operatic countertenors
21st-century Argentine male opera singers